Uday Samant  is an Indian politician and leader of Shiv Sena from Maharashtra. He is Cabinet Minister of Ministry of Industries (Maharashtra). He is current Member of Legislative Assembly from Ratnagiri. He has been elected to Vidhan Sabha for four consecutive terms in 2004, 2009, 2014 and 2019.

Early life
Samant was born in Ratnagiri region of Maharashtra.

Positions held
 2004: Elected to Maharashtra Legislative Assembly (1st term)
 2009: Re-Elected to Maharashtra Legislative Assembly (2nd term)
 2013 - 2014: Minister of State for Urban Development in Maharashtra Government 
 2013 - 2014: Guardian Minister of Ratnagiri district 
 2014: Re-Elected to Maharashtra Legislative Assembly (3rd term)
 2017 : Appointed Samparkh pramukh of Pune City 
 2018 : Appointed Deputy Leader of Shiv Sena Party 
 2018 : Appointed chairman of Maharashtra Housing and Area Development Authority (Mhada) 
 2019: Re-elected to Maharashtra Legislative Assembly (4th term) 
 2019: Appointed minister of Higher and Technical Education
 2020: Appointed guardian minister of Sindhudurg district
 2022: Took oath as cabinet minister in Eknath Shinde ministry.
14th August 2022: Appointed as Minister for Ministry of Industries (Maharashtra).

See also
 Eknath Shinde ministry
 Uddhav Thackeray ministry
 Ratnagiri–Sindhudurg Lok Sabha constituency
 Raigad Lok Sabha constituency

References

External links
  Shivsena Home Page 

Living people
People from Ratnagiri district
Maharashtra MLAs 2004–2009
Maharashtra MLAs 2009–2014
Maharashtra MLAs 2014–2019
Marathi politicians
Shiv Sena politicians
Year of birth missing (living people)
Nationalist Congress Party politicians